Manuel Archibald Lujan Jr. (May 12, 1928 – April 25, 2019) was an American politician from New Mexico who served in the U.S. House of Representatives as a Republican from 1969 to 1989 and as the United States Secretary of the Interior from 1989 to 1993. He was a colleague of George H. W. Bush in the House from 1969 to 1971. In 1989, President Bush named Lujan to his Cabinet.

Early life and education
Lujan was born in San Ildefonso Pueblo, New Mexico, into the family of Manuel A. Lujan Sr. and Lorenzita (Romero) Lujan. His father served as mayor of Santa Fe and was an unsuccessful candidate for governor and Congress. Lujan attended Catholic schools in Santa Fe. He attended Saint Mary's College of California in 1946, and graduated from the St. Michael's College in Santa Fe in 1950.

Career 
After college, Lujan went to work for the family insurance company, the Manuel Lujan Agencies, which his father had opened in 1925. The Albuquerque-based company remains a leading risk management and insurance firm; in 2002, it was ranked as the most profitable of New Mexico's Hispanic-owned businesses.

Lujan also followed his father into politics, launching his first campaign with a failed bid for the New Mexico State Senate in 1964. Three years later, he helped to found the Republican National Hispanic Assembly. Lujan's failed 1964 bid for political office was the last electoral defeat for him; after defeating incumbent Rep. Thomas G. Morris in 1968, he served in Congress for the next two decades.

Congress
Throughout the 1970s, Lujan sailed to reelection and built a reputation as a low-key, personable backbencher. His legislative interests were largely in line with the western U.S. states priorities of the time, including Indian affairs, nuclear power expansion, and the opening of federal lands to commerce and recreation. In 1978, Lujan was the first Hispanic Republican to join the recently formed Congressional Hispanic Caucus.

The 1980s brought new challenges and new prominence for Lujan. He nearly lost his seat in 1980 to an unexpectedly strong challenge from Democrat Bill Richardson. In the reapportionment that followed, Lujan's district was significantly altered after New Mexico picked up a third district. The old 1st was a largely rural district that included the northeastern portion of the state, including most of Albuquerque. The new 1st was a much more compact and urban district that included three-fourths of Albuquerque.

Due to the new demographics of his district, Lujan stood down as ranking Republican of the House Interior and Insular Affairs Committee and became ranking Republican of the House Science, Space and Technology Committee.

In addition to his congressional duties, Lujan represented New Mexico as a delegate to every Republican National Convention from 1972 to 2004. In 1980, he was a featured speaker at the convention on the night delegates met to nominate a vice presidential candidate.

Secretary of the Interior (1989–1993)
Beginning with Ronald Reagan's inauguration in 1981, Lujan was often mentioned as a potential nominee for Interior Secretary. Along with Dick Cheney, he was one of the top contenders to replace James G. Watt following his resignation, although the position eventually went to William Clark.

When the Bush transition team approached Lujan about the job in late 1988, he declined to accept it – but changed his mind only after a personal appeal from the president-elect. After the tenure of James Watt and Donald Hodel, Lujan was widely regarded as a moderate at the time of his unanimous confirmation in February 1989. His nomination faced little opposition, although some environmental groups criticized his congressional voting record (the League of Conservation Voters gave Lujan a 23 percent career rating).

Early tenure
Just months into his term, Lujan came under criticism from conservationists and the media for his hands-off approach to policy and his gaffe-prone speeches. In one oft-quoted error, he told a reporter that the federal government received royalty payments for certain mineral rights — only to later admit "I didn't know what I was talking about."

Offshore oil drilling
As the chairman of a White House task force studying offshore oil drilling, Lujan expressed his strong support for drilling off the California coast in a speech to western governors. Nineteen members of the California congressional delegation—all Democrats—and Republican Governor Pete Wilson called for Lujan to resign from the study group because he was prejudiced to one point of view but Lujan declined to step down from the post.

As the administration point man on offshore drilling, he opposed Democratic efforts to halt the practice after the Exxon Valdez oil spill in April 1989.

Endangered Species Act
Although Lujan gained more respect throughout his term, he remained a lightning rod for environmentalists. In a 1990 interview, Lujan described the Endangered Species Act as "too tough," and said it may not be necessary to "save every subspecies." The Bush administration distanced itself from Lujan's position at time when newspapers had just begun to write about the Interior Secretary's rebound from earlier public relations woes.

1992–1993
Other notable events of Lujan's term included frequent debates over the spotted owl, the construction of the Washington Commanders NFL Football Team stadium on federal property in Washington, D.C., and the increased regulation of Indian casinos. Lujan generally won praise for his handling of Indian affairs, an interest he had pursued earlier while in Congress.

After leaving the Interior Department at the expiration of Bush's term, Lujan characterized his job as one of constant tensions. "No one is satisfied. If you do something that's pro-development, you get the environmental groups against you, and if you do something that's pro-environmental you get the industry groups after you," Lujan said in a May 9, 1993 Associated Press report. "What I tried to do—and I think I was successful in doing—was to bring a balance between the use of resources on public lands and environmental concerns."

Post-Washington days
In the waning months of his term, Lujan was frequently named as a likely candidate for Governor of New Mexico in 1994. He moved quickly to squelch the rumors, saying he was "through running."

After leaving office, Lujan worked as a lobbyist and a public speaker. In 2004, he launched the Hispanic Alliance for Progress Institute, a conservative think-tank focusing on economic and "family values" issues from a Hispanic perspective.

Lujan's tenure at the Interior Department has since been commemorated with an award in his honor. Each year, the department presents the "Manuel Lujan Jr. Champion Award" to employees who exhibit "outstanding work in carrying out the department's mission." In addition, the Department and its Bureau of Indian Affairs honored Lujan by dedicating the BIA's administrative building in Albuquerque with Lujan's name.

Lujan's brother Edward (b. 1931) served as the New Mexico Republican Party chairman for many years and was a major influence to the development of the National Hispanic Cultural Center. Michelle Lujan Grisham, a Democrat who served three terms in Congress representing New Mexico's 1st District, elected state's governor in November 2018 is not related.

Personal life

Lujan died of heart failure on April 25, 2019 in Albuquerque, New Mexico.

References
"Manuel Lujan Jr." Hispanic Americans in Congress, 1822, 1995. Library of Congress.
Interior Honors Nine Employees With Manuel Lujan Jr. Champions Award
Duggan, Paul. "Lujan Guilty of Rape: Jury urges 20 years. Interior Secretary 'Saddened' by Son's Verdict." Washington Post. 01/21/1991. p. D1.
Eaton, William J. "Californians Demand Lujan Quit Task Force on Offshore Drilling." Los Angeles Times. 07/22/1989. p. 1.
Fritz, Sarah. "Lujan Shuns Confrontation—and Limelight." Los Angeles Times. 12/23/1988. p. 1–16.
Lancaster, John. "Lujan: Endangered Species Act 'Too Tough,' Needs Changes." Washington Post. 05/12/1990. p. A1.
Peterson, Cass. "Bush Cabinet's Weak Link. Affable, Gaffe-Prone Lujan Lack of Policy Focus Criticized at Interior." Washington Post. 05/15/1989. p. A1.
Plevin, Nancy. "Ex-Interior Boss Lujan Defends His Stewardship of Public Lands." Los Angeles Times. 05/09/1993. p. B5.
Sterritt, Kathleen. "Personalities." Washington Post. 01/08/1983. p. C3.
Swoboda, Frank. "Manuel Lujan Jr.: Lawmaker Rated Low on Lists Kept by Conservationists." Washington Post. 12/23/1988. p. A4.

See also
List of Hispanic and Latino Americans in the United States Congress

Notes

References

External links

Manuel Lujan Agencies (family-owned business)
Hispanic Alliance for Progress Institute (Organization Headed by Lujan)
 

|-

1928 births
2019 deaths
20th-century American politicians
American politicians of Mexican descent
Catholics from New Mexico
George H. W. Bush administration cabinet members
Hispanic and Latino American members of the Cabinet of the United States
Hispanic and Latino American members of the United States Congress
Manuel Jr.
People from San Ildefonso Pueblo, New Mexico
Politicians from Santa Fe, New Mexico
Republican Party members of the United States House of Representatives from New Mexico
United States Secretaries of the Interior
Members of Congress who became lobbyists